Johnson Covered Bridge can refer to

Braley Covered Bridge in Randolph, Vermont
Johnson Covered Bridge No. 28 in Cleveland Township, Columbia County, Pennsylvania